Time Waits for Everyone is the ninth studio album by actor and musician Viggo Mortensen, released in 2007. It is Mortensen's first release to only feature himself playing piano without the collaboration of anyone else. All tracks are improvisations inspired from trips to Hungary, Germany, Poland, Russia, and according to Mortensen, remembrance of things past.

The album was released on Mortensen's label Perceval Press but was later re-released on TDRS Music along with his next album At All.

Track listing

Credits

 Viggo Mortensen - piano, voice, and producer
 Travis Dickerson - producer, engineer, mastering, and mixing

References
Information of the album

2007 albums
Viggo Mortensen albums
TDRS Music albums